Scavenger is a Big Finish Productions audio drama based on the long-running British science fiction television series Doctor Who.

Plot 

The Doctor and Flip arrive in 2071 to view the launch of the Anglo-Indian Salvage 2 rocket, but they soon become separated and caught up in a 500-year tragedy played out in orbit.

Cast 
The Doctor – Colin Baker
Flip Jackson – Lisa Greenwood
Jyoti Cutler – Anjli Mohindra
Salim – Tariq Bhatti
Jessica Allaway – Kate McEwen
Anarkali/Melissa/Isra Tech #2 – Tania Rodrigues
Commander Gabbard/Scavenger/Isra Tech #1/Security Guy – John Banks

References

External links 
Scavenger at bigfinish.com

2014 audio plays
Sixth Doctor audio plays
Fiction set in the 1600s
Fiction set in 2071